Egídio de Araújo Pereira Júnior (born 16 June 1986), simply known as Egídio, is a Brazilian footballer who plays as a left back.

Club career

Flamengo and loans
Born in Rio de Janeiro, Egídio was a Flamengo youth graduate. He made his first team debut on 19 January 2003 at the age of just 16, coming on as a late substitute for Zé Carlos in a 2–1 Campeonato Carioca home win against Friburguense. He subsequently returned to the youth setup, being definitely promoted to the main squad only in the 2006 season.

Egídio made his Série A debut on 23 July 2006, replacing André Lima in a 3–0 away loss against Santa Cruz. Ahead of the 2007 campaign, he was loaned to fellow top-tier side Paraná; at the club he scored his first senior goal on 18 March 2007, netting his team's second in a 2–2 away draw against Coritiba for the Campeonato Paranaense championship.

In June 2007, Egídio was recalled by Fla, as starter Juan was heavily linked to a move to Espanyol. The move never materialized, and after again being rarely used, he served another loan stints at Juventude, Figueirense and Vitória.

Back to Flamengo for the 2011 season, Egídio was a regular starter during the year's state league. He started the league being a first-choice, scoring once in a 3–3 away draw against Bahia on 29 May, but lost space after the arrival of Júnior César, and was subsequently loaned to fellow league team Ceará on 22 June.

On 4 January 2012, Egídio was presented at Série B side Goiás. He was an undisputed starter for the club, scoring eight times and providing 28 assists as the club achieved promotion to the main category as champions.

Cruzeiro
On 5 December 2012, Egídio joined Cruzeiro on a permanent deal. A regular starter, he lifted the league trophy twice while also winning the Campeonato Mineiro in 2014.

Dnipro
On 6 January 2015, Egídio moved abroad for the first time in his career and joined Ukrainian club Dnipro Dnipropetrovsk. He only made his debut for the club on 19 February, in a 2–0 home win against Olympiacos for the UEFA Europa League.

In late March 2015, Egídio terminated his contract with Dnipro after allegedly not having been receiving wages.

Palmeiras
On 1 April 2015, Egídio was presented at Palmeiras, after agreeing to a contract until the end of 2017. Initially an undisputed starter, he fell down the pecking order in the following years, being constantly criticized by the club's supporters due to his performances.

Return to Cruzeiro
On 29 November 2017, Egídio returned to former club Cruzeiro after signing a two-year deal. On 28 February 2019, he renewed his contract until the end of 2020, but was a first-choice in the club's first-ever relegation from the top tier, being again subject of criticism by the club's supporters.

Career statistics

Honours

Club
Flamengo
Copa do Brasil: 2006
Taça Guanabara: 2008, 2011
Taça Rio: 2009, 2011
Campeonato Carioca: 2008, 2009, 2011

Vitória
Campeonato Baiano: 2010

Goiás
Campeonato Goiano: 2012
Campeonato Brasileiro Série B: 2012

Cruzeiro
Campeonato Brasileiro Série A: 2013, 2014
Campeonato Mineiro: 2014, 2018
Copa do Brasil: 2018

Palmeiras
Copa do Brasil: 2015
Campeonato Brasileiro Série A: 2016

Individual
 Campeonato Brasileiro Série A Team of the Year: 2014

References

External links

1986 births
Living people
Footballers from Rio de Janeiro (city)
Brazilian footballers
Campeonato Brasileiro Série A players
Campeonato Brasileiro Série B players
CR Flamengo footballers
Paraná Clube players
Esporte Clube Juventude players
Figueirense FC players
Esporte Clube Vitória players
Ceará Sporting Club players
Goiás Esporte Clube players
Cruzeiro Esporte Clube players
Sociedade Esportiva Palmeiras players
Fluminense FC players
Coritiba Foot Ball Club players
Tombense Futebol Clube players
Ukrainian Premier League players
FC Dnipro players
Expatriate footballers in Ukraine
Brazilian expatriate footballers
Brazilian expatriate sportspeople in Ukraine
Association football defenders